Chaman Lal Chaman was a London-based noted Panjabi poet, lyricist and radio broadcaster. He is the writer of a popular Panjabi song, saun da mahina, sung by Jagjit Singh in 1979. He also writes in Urdu and Hindi.

He wrote a Bhangra song for Gurinder Chadha's Bride and Prejudice, starring Aishwarya Rai with music by Anu Malik, and many songs and ghazals for Jagjit Singh and his wife Chitra Singh. His lyrics has also been sung by noted Indian singers like Asha Bhosle, Kumar Sanu and Sonu Nigam.

He worked as a radio presenter in Kenya and Britain and interviewed more than a hundred celebrities including, Sunil Dutt, Jawahar Lal Nehru and Naushad.

He was honored in London in 2010 and was presented the Asian Achievers Gold Award for his achievements in media, art and culture.

Chaman Lal Chaman died in 2019.

Early life and works 

Chaman was born in a small village of Jalandhar, Pasla. His mother died when he was a child and his father called him to Kenya where he worked as a presenter for Kenyan Radio, The Voice of Kenya, in Nairobi during the 1950s and 1960s and interviewed more than a hundred celebrities, including a noted Bollywood actor Sunil Dutt when he visited Kenya.

Later, spending nearly 18 years, from 1956 to 1974, he moved to Britain and worked at the Asian service of BBC and Panjab Radio, UK.

He started the first Indian commercial radio programme in London called Geetmala which became a rage among the Asian diaspora. He also anchored the weekly programmes on BBC's TV One and BBC Radio Four during the 1990s.

Literary works 

At the age of 13, he wrote a poem on Guru Nanak Dev's birthday and was given rupee 1 as an award which stirred his inner poet. After that he wrote many poems and has published three anthologies of his poems.

On the 50th anniversary of India and Pakistan's independence, he penned a play, Sare Jahan Se Achha, directed by the noted Punjabi writer Balwant Gargi and the music was composed by ghazal singer, Jagjit Singh. It was a major success when played in London and other cities of Britain in 1997 and 98.

See also 
Balwant Gargi

References 

Living people
Punjabi-language poets
Punjabi-language songwriters
BBC radio presenters
People from Jalandhar district
Hindi-language writers
Indian radio presenters
1934 births